Reuell Walters (born 16 December 2004) is an English professional footballer who plays as a defender for  club Arsenal.

Club career

Arsenal
Walters joined Premier League side Arsenal on 19 October 2020. He signed his first professional contract in February 2022.

Walters appeared twice as an unused substitute for Arsenal's first team during the 2022–23 season: in the Europa League last-16 first leg match away to Sporting CP at Estádio José Alvalade in Lisbon, Portugal on 9 March, and in the game of the 28th round of Premier League at Emirates Stadium against Crystal Palace on 19 March.

References

External links
 
 

2004 births
Living people
Footballers from Lambeth
English footballers
Association football defenders
Arsenal F.C. players